The 2007 All-Ireland Senior Football Championship Final was the 120th All-Ireland Final and the deciding match of the 2007 All-Ireland Senior Football Championship, an inter-county Gaelic football tournament for the top teams in Ireland.

It was only the second time in the GAA's history that two teams from the same province had contested an All-Ireland Football Final. Kerry won by 10 points.

Vincent Hogan wrote on two of the Kerry goals in the Irish Independent: "Cork gave them two beauties. It was like finding a burglar in your house and helping him to bring the boxes down the stairs"; in 2022, Martin Breheny listed it among "five of the worst" All-Ireland SFC finals since 1972.

References

All-Ireland Senior Football Championship Final
All-Ireland Senior Football Championship Final, 2007
All-Ireland Senior Football Championship Final
All-Ireland Senior Football Championship Finals
Cork county football team matches
Kerry county football team matches